Dieter Zembski (born 6 November 1946) is a German former professional footballer who played as a defender. He spent 12 seasons in the Bundesliga with SV Werder Bremen and Eintracht Braunschweig.

International career
Zembski represented West Germany once, in a friendly against Mexico in 1971. However, he could not establish himself in the national team against Berti Vogts and Paul Breitner and made no further appearances.

Personal life
Before and after his professional football career, Zembski played in various rock bands. In 1965 he performed with his band The Mushroams, in which he played drums, on the Beat-Club music program on German national television.

References

External links

1946 births
Living people
Footballers from Bremen
Association football defenders
German footballers
Germany international footballers
SV Werder Bremen players
Eintracht Braunschweig players
Bundesliga players